Animosity is a 2013 horror thriller film written and directed by Brendan Steere. It had its world premiere on May 13, 2013, and stars Tracy Willet and Marcin Paluch as two newlyweds who discover a sinister presence in the woods.

Premise
Mike (Marcin Paluch) and Carrie (Tracy Willet) Bonner are newly wed and have decided to move into a house set deep into a quiet and secluded forest. Carrie is unnerved by a series of strange encounters with others living in the area, encounters that her husband dismisses as nothing to worry about. She is horrified when she witnesses a violent event and becomes convinced that the area is home to sinister supernatural powers.

Cast
Marcin Paluch as Mike Bonner
Tracy Willet as Carrie Bonner
Thea McCartan as Lauren
Tom Martin as Carl Hampton
Stephan Goldbach as Tom
Alyssa Kempinski as Nicole
Matt Ziegel as Joe
Michelle Jones as Erin
Rob O'Rourke as Boy

Reception
Fangoria gave Animosity three skulls and praised the movie for its use of the film's setting, while the McPherson Sentinel commented that while they did enjoy the movie overall "the first third of the film is very rough". TVQC rated the movie highly and compared it favorably to Blue Ruin and Cold in July. Bloody Disgusting was mixed and gave the movie two skulls, stating that the movie could very well improve with repeated viewings and that they would write a new review if this was the case, but that they left the theater "feeling worn out and unsatisfied."

Awards
 Dreamer Award for Best Horror Film at the Buffalo Dreams Fantastic Film Festival (2013, won)
 Dreamer Award for Best Actress at the Buffalo Dreams Fantastic Film Festival (2013, won - Tracy Willet)

References

External links
 
 Indie GoGo campaign
 SVA Dustys 2013: Q&A with the Director of ‘Animosity’

2013 films
2013 horror films
2010s English-language films